SIFF may refer to:
 Seattle International Film Festival, established 1976
 Sedona International Film Festival, established 1994
 Shanghai International Film Festival, established 1993
 Singapore International Film Festival, established  1987
 Sofia International Film Festival, established 1997
 Sonoma International Film Festival, established 1997
 Save Indian Family Foundation, a men's rights organization in India

People with the surname
 Gregory Siff
 Maggie Siff